Oumayma Dardour (born 6 January 1996) is a Tunisian handball player for Club Africain and the Tunisian national team.

She participated at the 2015 World Women's Handball Championship.

References

1996 births
Living people
Tunisian female handball players